The 2016 United States House of Representatives elections in Missouri were held on November 8, 2016, to elect the eight U.S. representatives from the state of Missouri, one from each of the state's eight congressional districts. The elections coincided with the 2016 U.S. presidential election, as well as other elections to the House of Representatives, elections to the United States Senate and various state and local elections. The primaries were held on August 2.

Overview

District 1

The 1st district includes all of St. Louis City and much of Northern St. Louis County, and it has a PVI of D+28.  The incumbent is Democrat Lacy Clay, who has represented the district since 2001. He was re-elected with 73% of the vote in 2014.

Democratic primary
The incumbent is running for re-election. State Senator Maria Chappelle-Nadal and perennial candidate Bill Haas are primary challengers for Clay.

Results

Republican primary
Community activist Paul Berry III and Steven G. Bailey are running for the Republican nomination.

Results

Libertarian primary

Results

General election

Results

District 2

The 2nd district includes the suburbs south and west of St. Louis City.  The incumbent is Republican Ann Wagner, who has represented the district since 2013. She was re-elected with 64% of the vote in 2014 and the district has a PVI of R+8.

Democratic primary
Democratic State Representative Bill Otto is running against Wagner.

Results

Republican primary
Wagner is running for re-election with one opponent in the primary, Greg Sears.

Results

Libertarian primary

Results

Green Party
David Arnold is the Green Party nominee.

General election

Results

District 3

The third district stretches from exurbs of St. Louis to the state capitol Jefferson City and has a PVI of R+13. Republican Blaine Luetkemeyer represents the third district. He has been speculated about as a potential candidate for Governor of Missouri in the 2016 gubernatorial election, rather than as a candidate for re-election to the U. S. House. In January 2015, Luetkemeyer said that he would "probably" run for re-election and not run for Governor.

Democratic primary
Kevin Miller of St. Charles is running for the seat.

Results

Republican primary
Luetkemeyer is running with one opponent in the primary, former state representative Cynthia Davis.

Results

Libertarian primary

Results

Constitution primary

Results

General election

Results

District 4

The fourth district takes in Columbia and much of rural west-central Missouri. It has a PVI of R+13. Republican Vicky Hartzler has represented the district since the election of 2010, when she defeated long-time incumbent Democrat Ike Skelton. She was re-elected in 2014 with 68% of the vote.

Democratic primary
University of Missouri Hospital Chief of Staff Gordon Christensen is running for the Democratic nomination. Also running is Jack Truman of Lamar, who was a candidate for the Democratic nomination in District 7 in 2004, and the Democratic nominee in that district in 2006. Jim White, a retired investment banker and 2012 State House candidate, was also running but announced on February 22, 2016 that he was suspending his campaign due to medical issues.

Results

Republican primary
Hartzler is running with one opponent in the primary, John Webb, who also ran against Hartzler in 2014.

Results

Libertarian primary
Mark Bliss is running unopposed for the Libertarian nomination. He graduated with a degree in Sociology from the University of Central Missouri and serves as a co-pastor of a local church group in Warrensburg. His political views tend to lean toward the conservative mindset, opposing gun control, aiming to lower taxes including an end to the income tax, limiting abortions and proposing a restriction at 20 weeks, and replacing the Affordable Care Act with private market-based care. However, he also claims to reach Democrats with his message. He opposes bank and industry bail-outs and subsidies, intends to cut overseas military spending and end military occupations, supports the legalization of marijuana for medical and recreational use, and pledges to better defend the civil rights of racial minorities and women than the current administration. His website explains his positions on other issues.

Results

General election

Results

District 5

The fifth district encompasses most of Jackson County, the southern part of Clay County, and three other rural counties to the east. It has a PVI of D+9. Democrat Emanuel Cleaver has been representing it since 2005. He was re-elected in 2014 with 51.6% of the vote.

Democratic primary
Cleaver is running for re-election with one opponent in the primary, Roberta Gough.

Results

Republican primary
Austin Rucker, Berton Knox, Michael Burris, and Jacob Turk are running for the Republican nomination. Turk has been the Republican nominee against Cleaver in all of Cleaver's re-election bids: 2006, 2008, 2010, 2012, and 2014.

Results

Libertarian primary

Results

General election

Results

District 6

The sixth district encompasses rural northern Missouri and has a PVI of R+12. Republican Sam Graves has been representing it since 2001. He was re-elected in 2014 with 67% of the vote.

Democratic primary
Edward Dawyne Fields, who also ran in 2014, Kyle Yarber, who was the Democratic nominee in 2012, David Blackwell, Matthew McNabney, and Travis Gonzales,  are running for the Democratic nomination.

Results

Republican primary
Christopher Ryan and Kyle Reid have filed to challenge Graves in the primary. Ryan has challenged Graves in 2010, 2012, and 2014, and Reid challenged Graves as well in 2014.

Results

Green Party
Mike Diel is the Green Party nominee.

Libertarian primary

Results

General election

Results

District 7

The seventh district takes in Springfield, Joplin, and much of the rest of rural southwestern Missouri. It has a PVI of R+19, the most strongly Republican district of Missouri. Republican Billy Long has been representing the district since 2011. He was re-elected in 2014 with 63% of the vote.

Democratic primary
Genevieve Williams, Camille Lombardi-Olive, and Steven Reed are running for the Democratic nomination.

Results

Republican primary
Businessman Christopher Batsche previously announced a primary challenge of Senator Roy Blunt but withdrew from that race and filed to challenge Long for the Republican nomination. Also running against Long are Matthew Evans, Lyndle Spencer, Nathan Bradham, Matt Canovi, James Nelson, and Mary Byrne.

Results

Libertarian primary

Results

General election

Results

District 8

The eighth district is the most rural district of Missouri, taking in all of the rural southeastern and south-central part of the state. It has a PVI of R+17. Republican Jason Smith won a special election June 4, 2013 with 67% of the vote, and was re-elected in 2014 with the same percentage.

Democratic primary
Dave Cowell is unopposed.

Results

Republican primary
Smith will be faced in the Republican primary by Dr. Hal Brown, Phillip Smith, and Todd Mahn.

Results

Libertarian primary

Results

General election

Results

References

External links
U.S. House elections in Missouri, 2016 at Ballotpedia
Campaign contributions at OpenSecrets

Missouri
2016
House